The 2013 IFSC Climbing World Cup was held in 19 locations. Bouldering competitions were held in 8 locations, lead in 8 locations, and speed in 7 locations. The season began on 22 March in Chongqing, China and concluded on 17 November in Kranj, Slovenia.

The top 3 in each competition received medals, and the overall winners were awarded trophies. At the end of the season an overall ranking was determined based upon points, which athletes were awarded for finishing in the top 30 of each individual event.

The winners for bouldering were Dmitrii Sharafutdinov and Anna Stöhr, for lead Sachi Amma and Jain Kim, for speed Stanislav Kokorin and Alina Gaidamakina, and for combined Jakob Schubert and Mina Markovič, men and women respectively.
The National Team for bouldering was Austria, for lead Japan, and for speed Russian Federation.

Highlights of the season 
In bouldering, at the World Cup in Kitzbühel, Anna Stöhr of Austria flashed all boulders in the final round to take the win.

In speed climbing, at the World Cup in Wujiang, Iuliia Kaplina of Russia set a new world record of 7.85s in the final round against her teammate Mariia Krasavina. 
Then at the end of the season, Russian athletes, Stanislav Kokorin and Alina Gaidamakina clinched the overall titles of the season for men and women respectively, making it double speed titles for Russia.

Overview

References 

IFSC Climbing World Cup
2013 in sport climbing